The 2011 Special Honours in New Zealand were two Special Honours Lists, published in New Zealand on 20 May and 17 August 2011. Appointments were made to the New Zealand Order of Merit and the Queen's Service Order to recognise the incoming governor-general, Jerry Mateparae, and the outgoing vice-regal consort, Susan, Lady Satyanand.

In addition, two other Special Honours Lists, published on 2 April and 1 October, promulgated the 2011 New Zealand bravery awards and the 2011 New Zealand gallantry awards.

New Zealand Order of Merit

Knight Grand Companion (GNZM)
Additional
 Lieutenant General Jeremiah Mateparae  – Governor-General Designate

Companion of the Queen's Service Order (QSO)
Additional
 Lieutenant General Jeremiah Mateparae  – Governor-General Designate
 Susan Jean, Lady Satyanand

References

Special honours
Special honours